Breznica is one of ten villages in the Municipality of Žirovnica in the Upper Carniola region of Slovenia. It is the seat of the municipality. Most of the village has developed on the slopes of the Reber range, leaving open fields towards the south and east. To the west the built-up area has extended to Zabreznica.

Name
Breznica was attested in written sources as Fressnicz in 1421, Fresiach in 1464, Nabresnitze between 1493 and 1501, and Presnitz in 1498, among other spellings. The name is derived from the common noun breza 'birch'. Like similar toponyms in Slovenia (e.g., Brezova, Brezovec, Brezovci), it originally referred to the local vegetation.

Church

The parish church in Breznica is dedicated to Our Lady of Sorrows. Construction of the current parish church began in 1819, and its architect was Blasio Zamolo from Gemona, whose signature can be found above the main entrance. The church was extensively renovated in 1993. In front of the church stands a monument to those who fell in World War I, designed by the architect Jože Plečnik.

Notable people
Notable people that were born or lived in Breznica include:
Anton Janša (1734–1773), beekeeper
Andrej Osterman (born 1960), the 25th Commander-in-General of the Slovenian Army, lives in the town

Notes

External links 

Breznica at Geopedia
Žirovnica Tourist Association site

Populated places in the Municipality of Žirovnica